Ann-Christin Ahlberg (born September 27, 1957), is a Swedish politician for the Social Democratic Party and a member of the Swedish Riksdag since 2006. She is taking up seat number 19 for Västra Götaland County South constituency. She works as a nanny and as a politician. She lives in Borås and is married with two adult children.

Political career 
She was first brought into the Riksdag in 2005 as a replacement for a colleague who left the Riksdag. After the 2006 general election she was officially elected to the Riksdag. Between 2005 and 2006 she was an alternate for the Labour Market Committee and the Social Insurance Committee. After the 2006 election, she became an official member of those committees.

During the 2010 general election she left the Social Insurance Committee and became an alternate for the Defence Committee. After the 2018 general elections she left the Social Insurance Committee to join the Health and Welfare Committee.

References

Living people
1957 births
Members of the Riksdag from the Social Democrats
Women members of the Riksdag
Members of the Riksdag 2006–2010
Members of the Riksdag 2010–2014
Members of the Riksdag 2014–2018
21st-century Swedish women politicians
Members of the Riksdag 2002–2006
Members of the Riksdag 2018–2022